Chacko Poulose (P. Chacko) was a member of the Kerala Legislative Assembly from 1960–1964, representing Thiruvalla constituency.

Early life
Born in Kumbanad, he settled down in Thiruvalla. His father was Poulose Upadesi.

Chacko obtained his B. A. and L.T. (present day Bachelor of Education) degree from University of Travancore (present day University of Kerala). Later he joined the Syrian Christian Seminary School (SCS), in Thiruvalla as a teacher.

Election
He was a member of the Indian National Congress and was a freedom fighter.  In 1960, he stood representing Thiruvalla constituency for Kerala Legislative Assembly election and won. Opposing him was P. T. Punnose, a veteran Communist party leader.

P. Chacko died in 1978.

References

Indian National Congress politicians from Kerala
Malayali politicians
Year of birth missing
1978 deaths
Kerala MLAs 1960–1964